is a railway station on the Kashii Line operated by JR Kyushu in Higashi-ku, Fukuoka, Fukuoka Prefecture, Japan.

Lines

Station layout 
The station, which is unstaffed, consists of a side platform serving a single track. A station building, of timber construction in the European style, houses a waiting area and automatic ticket vending machines. After the ticket gates, a ramp leads to the platform.

Adjacent stations

History
Japanese National Railways (JNR) opened the station on 1 August 1960 as an additional station on the existing track of the Kashii Line. With the privatization of JNR on 1 April 1987, JR Kyushu took over control of the station.

On 14 March 2015, the station, along with others on the line, became a remotely managed "Smart Support Station". Under this scheme, although the station became unstaffed, passengers using the automatic ticket vending machines or ticket gates could receive assistance via intercom from staff at a central support centre.

Passenger statistics
In fiscal 2016, the station was used by an average of 1,165 passengers daily (boarding passengers only), and it ranked 148th among the busiest stations of JR Kyushu.

References

External links
Nata (JR Kyushu)

Railway stations in Fukuoka Prefecture
Railway stations in Japan opened in 1960